Ruttellerona is a genus of moths in the family Geometridae first described by Charles Swinhoe in 1894.

Species
Some species of this genus are:

Ruttellerona cessaria Walker, 1860
Ruttellerona harmonica Hampson, 1898
Ruttellerona kalisi Prout, 1935
Ruttellerona lithina Warren, 1903
Ruttellerona obsequens Prout, 1929
Ruttellerona pallicostaria Moore, 1868
Ruttellerona presbytica Robinson, 1975
Ruttellerona pseudocessaria Holloway, 1994
Ruttellerona pulverulenta Warren, 1897
Ruttellerona scotozonea Hampson, 1900
Ruttellerona stigmaticosta Prout, 1928

References

Boarmiini